Edward Hald (17 September 1883 – 4 July 1980) was a Swedish sculptor. His work was part of the art competitions at the 1932 Summer Olympics and the 1936 Summer Olympics.

References

1883 births
1980 deaths
20th-century Swedish sculptors
Swedish male sculptors
Olympic competitors in art competitions
Artists from Stockholm